Bellatorias is a genus of skinks. Species are endemic to Australia. Species were previously placed in the genus Egernia.

Species
The following 3 species, listed alphabetically by specific name, are recognized as being valid:

Nota bene: A binomial authority in parentheses indicates that the species was originally described in a genus other than Bellatorias.

References

 
Lizard genera